Ordinary Joe is an American drama television series.

Ordinary Joe may also refer to:

 Average Joe (Ordinary Joe), a term used to refer to an average person
 "Ordinary Joe", a song by English band Cubanate on their album Interference
 "Ordinary Joe (WCH)", a song by rapper Weerd Science on his album Friends and Nervous Breakdowns